Lyudmila Ivanovna Khityaeva (August 15, 1930 in Gorky (Nizhny Novgorod), USSR) is a Soviet and Russian theater and film actress, TV presenter. People's Artist of the RSFSR (1983).

Filmography 
 Ekaterina Voronina (1957)
 And Quiet Flows the Don (1958)
 Virgin Soil Upturned (1959–61)
 The Night Before Christmas (1961)
 Yevdokiya (1961)
 The Cook (1965)
 Russian Field (1971)
 Privalov's Millions (1972)
 Finist, the brave Falcon (1975)

References

External links
  
 Biographical information

1930 births
Living people
Soviet actresses
Russian actresses
Recipients of the Order of Honour (Russia)
Honored Artists of the RSFSR
People's Artists of the RSFSR
Actors from Nizhny Novgorod
Russian television presenters
Russian women television presenters
20th-century Russian women